Cecilia Martinez (born May 24, 1947) is an American former professional tennis player.

Biography
Martinez, born and raised in San Francisco by a single mother, is one of five siblings and learned her tennis playing on public courts. She attended San Francisco State College and won the singles event at the USTA Intercollegiate National Championships in 1966.

During her career on the international circuit she was a Philippines Open singles champion and reached the quarter-finals of the 1970 Wimbledon Championships, upsetting third seed Virginia Wade en route. She was active in the movement for women's tennis to become professional, which led to the establishment of the Women’s Tennis Association.

Martinez had a best national ranking of 11 for singles and four in doubles.

Since retiring she has been inducted into the Hall of Fames of the Intercollegiate Tennis Association, USTA Northern California and the San Francisco State Gators.

WTA Tour finals

Doubles: 1 (0–1)

References

External links
 
 

1947 births
Living people
American female tennis players
San Francisco State Gators athletes
Tennis players from San Francisco
21st-century American women
College women's tennis players in the United States